The Eastern Idaho Railroad  commenced on November 21, 1993, as a collection of two disconnected clusters of former Union Pacific (UP) branches. A subsidiary of Watco, EIRR operates two segments that move more than 35,000 carloads per year to the Union Pacific, with interchanges at Idaho Falls on the Northern Segment, and Minidoka on the Southern segment. The annual income is reported as being under 25 million dollars.

The Southern segment

The Southern lines consist of: 
UP's former Twin Falls Branch (Minidoka to Buhl, 74 miles) 
UP's former North Side Branch (Rupert to Wendell, 57 miles) 
the Raft River Industrial Lead (Burley to Declo, 9miles)
the Oakley Industrial Lead (Burley to Martin, 11 miles).
Operations are based out of the ex-UP depots at Twin Falls and Rupert. The southern segment interchanges with UP at Minidoka, Idaho.

The Northern Segment

The Northern lines consist of:
Union Pacific's former (Utah northern) main line in Idaho Falls (5 miles) 
the Yellowstone Branch (Idaho Falls to Ashton, 52 miles) 
the St Anthony Industrial Lead (Saint Anthony to Egin, 12 miles) 
the Goshen Industrial Lead (Ammon to Lincoln Junction, 4 miles) 
the East Belt Branch (Newdale to Orvin, 38 miles),
the West Belt Industrial Lead (Ucon to Menan, 10 miles).

External links
Eastern Idaho Railroad

Idaho railroads
Watco
Spin-offs of the Union Pacific Railroad
1993 establishments in Idaho